This is a list of Bien de Interés Cultural landmarks in the Province of Tarragona, Catalonia, Spain.

 Wall of Tarragona

References 

 
Tarragona